Marcus Samuel may refer to:

Marcus Samuel, 1st Viscount Bearsted (1853–1927), founder of the Shell Transport and Trading Company
Marcus Samuel, 3rd Viscount Bearsted (1909–1986), British peer and company director
Marcus Samuel (philatelist) (1904–1997), British philatelist
Marcus Samuel (politician) (1873–1942), British Member of Parliament for Putney, 1934–1942